Celeste O'Connor (born December 2, 1998) is a Kenyan-born American actor. They are known for playing Paloma Davis in the Amazon original film, Selah and the Spades.

Early life and education 
Celeste O'Connor was born on December 2, 1998, in Nairobi, Kenya. O'Connor and their younger brother were raised in Baltimore, Maryland by their parents. They attended Notre Dame Preparatory School and studied the violin and singing at Peabody Preparatory. O'Connor attends Johns Hopkins University and is majoring in public health and pre-medicine. They have also taken courses in Islamic studies. O'Connor is interested in the social determinants of health including food security, housing insecurity, and education.

Career 
O'Connor played the younger version of Gugu Mbatha-Raw's character in the 2018 Netflix film, Irreplaceable You. They appeared in the 2019 film, Wetlands. In 2019, O'Connor played Paloma Davis in the film, Selah and the Spades. Reporter Anagha Komaragiri of The Daily Californian praised O'Connor's "subtle" and "pensive presence" until the "tense finale." O'Connor was cast in July 2019 for the 2021 film, Ghostbusters: Afterlife. O'Connor is non-binary.

O'Connor is an advocate for improving diversity and representation in the entertainment industry.

Filmography

References

External links 
 

1998 births
Living people
LGBT people from Maryland
People from Nairobi
21st-century American actors
21st-century Kenyan actors
Actors from Baltimore
African-American actors
American film actors
Kenyan film actors
Johns Hopkins University alumni
Kenyan emigrants to the United States
21st-century African-American people
American non-binary actors
Kenyan non-binary actors
LGBT African Americans
21st-century LGBT people